Daniel Rahimi (born April 28, 1987) is an Iranian-Swedish professional ice hockey defenceman for IF Björklöven in the Hockeyallsvenskan (Allsv.). He was selected by the Vancouver Canucks in the third round (82nd overall) of the 2006 NHL Entry Draft.

Playing career
After playing with the junior and senior teams of IF Björklöven in the Swedish J20 SuperElit and HockeyAllsvenskan (Swe-1) leagues, Rahimi was selected 82nd overall in the third round of the 2006 NHL Entry Draft by the Vancouver Canucks. Rahimi was scouted as a stay-at-home defenceman, drafted on the recommendation of the Canucks Swedish scout and former player Thomas Gradin.

Upon being drafted, he returned to IF Björklöven in 2006–07, then joined the Manitoba Moose, the Canucks' American Hockey League (AHL) affiliate, for the playoffs once his season in the HockeyAllsvenskan had finished. In 2007–08, he split the season between the Moose and the Victoria Salmon Kings, the Canucks' ECHL affiliate, scoring five points in 19 ECHL games and five points in 41 AHL games. After spending the 2008–09 season entirely with the Moose, he was traded by the Canucks along with fellow prospect Patrick White to the San Jose Sharks for defencemen Christian Ehrhoff and Brad Lukowich on August 28, 2009.

After two full regular seasons with the Manitoba Moose, he signed with the Elitserien (SEL) team Rögle BK for the 2009–10 season to make his debut in the top Swedish league. In 55 games, he scored eight points, but in the 2010 Kvalserien regulation tournament, Rögle were relegated to the Swe-1 league. To remain in the SEL league, he signed a two-year contract lasting until the end of the 2011–12 season with HV71. He then signed a two-year contract with Linköpings HC in the same league, expiring after the 2012–13 season.

On March 5, 2016, he signed a one-year contract with HC Davos of the NLA. After one year in Switzerland, Rahimi returned to his native Sweden, signing with the Växjö Lakers in April 2017.

International play

Rahimi has played for Sweden in two World Junior Championships. He made his debut at the 2006 World Junior Championships in British Columbia, tallying two points in five games as Sweden finished the tournament in fifth place. At the 2007 World Junior Championships the following year, in his home country, Sweden finished in fourth as the host country. Rahimi did not register a point during the tournament.

He won a bronze medal with the Swedish national team at the 2014 IIHF World Championships.

Personal life
Daniel Rahimi was born in Umeå, Sweden, to an Iranian father and a Swedish mother. He grew up a fan of countryman Mattias Öhlund.

Career statistics

Regular season and playoffs

International

Awards and honours

References

External links
 

1987 births
HC Davos players
HV71 players
IF Björklöven players
IF Troja/Ljungby players
Linköping HC players
Living people
Manitoba Moose players
Sportspeople from Umeå
Rögle BK players
Sportspeople of Iranian descent
Swedish ice hockey defencemen
Swedish people of Iranian descent
Vancouver Canucks draft picks
Växjö Lakers players
Victoria Salmon Kings players